Stephen of Durazzo (born Stefano di Durazzo, later known as Estêvão de Nápoles in Portugal) (c.1320-1380) was an Italian nobleman and warrior, the claimed youngest son of John, Duke of Durazzo, ruler of the Kingdom of Albania, by his wife Agnés de Périgord and a grandson of king Charles II of Naples. But this is a posterior fabrication, as the origin of the surname de Nápoles, for there is no notice of any such legitimate or bastard son of a Prince of Naples. He moved to Portugal as a crusader, having fought the Moors alongside "his cousin" king Afonso IV of Portugal at the battle of Salado, as mentioned in Duarte Nunes de Leão's Chronicles of the Kings of Portugal. Known in Portugal as Estêvão de Nápoles (Stephen of Naples), he gave origin to the Portuguese family Nápoles, a false branch of the royal Capetian House of Anjou-Naples.

Marriage and children 

Stephen of Durazzo is known to have married in Portugal, but his wife's name is not known. His only (known) son was Leonardo Estêvão de Nápoles, although an unnamed daughter is sometimes referred.

See also 

Nápoles
Duchy of Durazzo (Angevin)
Capetian House of Anjou

References
Pereira Marques, António Augusto. Os Senhores das Honras de Molelos e o Asilo da Folhadosa. Guarda, 1953; pp. 6-8.
Nunes de Leão, Duarte. Crónicas dos Reis de Portugal. Edited by M. Lopes de Almeida, Porto, Lello & Irmão, 1975. p. 265

Stephen